Stephen Hodges (born February 12, 1952) is an American percussionist and composer. He is best known for his work with Mavis Staples, Tom Waits, Mike Watt, T Bone Burnett, Rick Holmstrom, and film director David Lynch.

Discography 
Tom Waits – Swordfishtrombones
Tom Waits – Rain Dogs
Tom Waits – Mule Variations
Tom Waits –  Beautiful Maladies: The Island Years
Mike Watt – Contemplating the Engine Room
Mavis Staples - Livin' on a High Note
Jonathan Richman – Her Mystery Not of High Heels
Until the end of the World (Soundtrack) w/ David Lynch & Angelo Badalamenti
Twin Peaks: Fire Walk With Me (Soundtrack) w/ David Lynch
Divine Secrets of the Ya-Ya Sisterhood (Soundtrack)
Wanda Jackson – Heart Trouble
John Hammond – Wicked Grin
John Hammond – Ready for Love
John Hammond – In Your Arms Again
Dave Alvin – Museum of Heart
Charlie Musselwhite – In My Time
Charlie Musselwhite – Rough News
Sam Phillips – Martinis and Bikinis
Sam Phillips – Zero Zero Zero
Lester Butler – 13
Robert Deeble – Days Like These
Robert Deeble – Earthside Down
Robert Deeble – Heart Like Feathers
Bruce Cockburn – You've Never Seen Everything
The Fabulous Thunderbirds – Live
Marc Ford – Marc Ford and the Neptune Blues Club
James Harman – This Band Just Won't Behave
James Harman – Thank You Baby
James Harman – Those Dangerous Gentlemen
James Harman – Live in '85 vol. 1
James Harman – Takin' Chances
James Harman – Extra Napkins vol. 1
James Harman – Mo Na'Kins, Please vol. 2
James Harman – Lonesome Moon Trance
mssv - Live Flowers

Film
Fire Walk With Me (film) actor – Directed by David Lynch – 1991

Theater
Hodges was Musical Director-Composer for Patrick Murphy's 1999 production of Eugène Ionesco's Exit the King starring John C. Reilly.

Touring musician
Stephen Hodges was the touring percussionist on Smashing Pumpkins 1998 tour in support of the album Adore.

References

External links 
 Stephen Hodges Homepage
 Mike Watt 1998 Tour Page

1952 births
American percussionists
American male composers
21st-century American composers
Living people
21st-century American male musicians